"Thank God I Do" is the lead single, released on March 8, 2023, from Lauren Daigle's eponymous fourth studio album.

Background
Lauren Daigle explains that it emerged from COVID-19 lockdowns and uncertainties. Amid those experiences, the singer says she realized, “God puts very specific people in your life for a very specific reason. And I needed the people in my life at that time around me to keep my head above the water.”"

Composition
"Thank God I Do" is originally in the key of G Major, with a tempo of 94 beats per minute. Written in common time, Diagle's vocal range spans from D3 to C5 during the song.

Music video
A lyric video for the song premiered on March 18, 2023, on YouTube.

Credits and personnel
Credits adapted from Genius.
Mike Elizondo – producer
Jason Ingram – composer & lyricist
Alicia Moore – composer & lyricist
Jeff Bhasker – composer & lyricist
Nate Ruess – composer & lyricist
Justin Francis – engineer

Charts

Release history

References

2023 singles
2023 songs
Lauren Daigle songs